Diadegma insulare is a wasp first described by Ezra Townsend Cresson in 1865. No subspecies are listed. It is a parasitoid of the diamondback moth, which is a pest of cruciferous crops.

References

insulare
Insects described in 1865
Taxa named by Ezra Townsend Cresson